John W. Holmes (12 April 1917 – 25 May 2001) was a film editor. He was one of the editors on Diamonds Are Forever and The Andromeda Strain.

He was nominated along with Stuart Gilmore at the 44th Academy Awards in the category of Best Film Editing for the film The Andromeda Strain. He died in 2001.

Filmography

Inchon (1981)
Popyeye (1980)
Just You and Me, Kid (1979)
Daddy, I Don't Like It Like This (1978)
Just Tell Me You Love Me (1978)
Killer Bees (1974)
Jarrett (1973)
Showdown (1973)
The Andromeda Strain (1971)
Crosscurrent (1971)
Diamonds Are Forever (1971)
The Only Game in Town (1970)
Chubasco (1967)
Goodbye Charlie (1964)

References

External links

Film editors
2001 deaths
1917 births